Delas (from ) is a city in Beni Suef Governorate of Egypt, situated on the left bank of the Nile.

In Ptolemaic and Byzantine Egypt it was known as Tilothis or Nilopolis.
 
It was an episcopal see that a suffragan of the metropolitan of Oxyrynchos, in the Roman province of Arcadia Aegypti, and is included as such in the Catholic Church's list of titular sees.

History
According to Ptolemy (IV, v, 26) the city was situated on an island of the Nile in the Heraclean nome.

Eusebius (Ecclesiastical History, VI, xli) states that it had a bishop, Cheremon, during the persecution of Decius; others are mentioned a little later.
 
"The Chronicle of John of Nikiou" (559) alludes to this city in connection with the occupation of Egypt by the Muslims, and it is also referred to by Arabian medieval geographers under its original name of Delas. In the fourteenth century it paid 20,000 dinars in taxes, which indicates a place of some importance.
 
In the khedival period, Delas was a part of the moudirieh of Beni-Suef in the district of El-Zaouiet, and had about 2500 inhabitants of whom nearly 1000 were nomadic Bedouins.

References

Populated places in Beni Suef Governorate
Catholic titular sees in Africa